Madwa-Nika Cadet is a Canadian politician, who was elected to the National Assembly of Quebec in the 2022 Quebec general election. She represents the riding of Bourassa-Sauvé as a member of the Quebec Liberal Party.

References

21st-century Canadian politicians
21st-century Canadian women politicians
Quebec Liberal Party MNAs
Women MNAs in Quebec
Black Canadian politicians
Black Canadian women
Canadian people of Haitian descent
Living people
Year of birth missing (living people)
Politicians from Montreal